Arshak Sarkissian (born December 26, 1981), is an Armenian painter and artist.

Biography

Arshak Sarkissian was born in Gyumri, Armenia, into the family of painter Ararat Sarkissian. After the 1988 Armenian earthquake, he moved to Yerevan.

In 1998, he graduated from National Aesthetic Center of art,AYerevan, Armenia, 2001–2002 Postgraduary Cyprus College of Art, Paphos, Cyprus.

Sarkissian designed the interior of passenger terminals in Zvartnots International Airport￼￼ . Sarkissian an paints with oil and pastel  on canvases, but also does sketches with ink. He has also combined models and photography in his works "Bird Man" and "Chicken Man" His style can be described as surreal.  

As a painter he is, at the same time, an anthropologist of states of mind. He depicts animals along with his characters, a fact that also leaves room to physiognomic confusing interpretations.

Sarkissian's name is among the Verfhon's 2014 List of Painters.

Exhibitions 
Since 1999 Arshak Sarkissian's works have been exhibited throughout the world.

Solo exhibitions 
2018 Tufenkian Fine Arts, California
1999 National Aesthetic Center of Art, Armenia
2000 Opus 39, Nicosia, Cyprus
2004 Opus 39, Nicosia, Cyprus
2005 Academy Gallery, Yerevan, Armenia
2009 Albemarle Gallery, UK, London
2010 Mildberry Gallery, Russia, Moscow
2010 Gavriel Gallery, Germany.Bremen
2011 Opus 39, Nicosia, Cyprus
2012 Antikyan Gallery, Yerevan, Armenia
2016 AS Gallery, Ljubljana, Slovenia

Group exhibitions 
1997 Zircular 5, Modern Art Museum, Yerevan, Armenia
1998 Take It, Center of Modern and Experimental Art, Yerevan, Armenia
1998 1st Gyumri International Biennial, Armenia
1999 "Mind Fanatics", ACCEA, Yerevan, Armenia
2000 ACCEA Virtual Art, Yerevan, Armenia
2000 2nd International Biennial Gyumri, Armenia
2002 Morphi Gallery, Limassol, Cyprus
2005 Edwar's Fine Arts Gallery San Francisco, United States
2005 5th Gyumri International Biennial, Armenia
2006 Marie Pavgas, Art Gallery, Arsheville, North Carolina, USA
2007 Harvest Gallery. California, USA
2008 Center for contemporary Experimental Art, Armenia
2013 Charlie Smith Gallery, London Anthology, UK

Awards 
2005 Presidential Gold Medal for Fine Arts

Quotes from Arshak Sarkissian
"In historical paintings you may see very different levels of importance were given to the face of a king, for example, and to his dog. I am more of a documental artist. Beautiful and ugly are the same to me. Every image—man, woman, child, pair of shoes, gets the same attention.""My work is about the idea of someone, their personality, the atmosphere they create. It is not about what they are doing but what they make you feel. When you look at them, you don't think about what their names are. You conceive the concept of two people holding hands."

Gallery

See also
List of Armenian artists
List of Armenians
Culture of Armenia

References

External links
 Arshak Sarkissian, official page
 Saarchi Art, Arshak Sarkissian
 The Week of Madness by Arshak Sarkissian
 Gyumri Artist Takes on The United Kingdom

1981 births
Armenian painters
Living people